The 2012–13 Regional Four Day Competition was the 47th domestic first-class cricket tournament held in the West Indies. It will take place from 9 February 2013 – 7 May 2013. The seven teams based in the Caribbean competed in a round-robin tournament followed by semi-finals involving the top four teams and a final match between the winners of the semi-finals. There was no touring team competing this edition of the tournament.

Table

Group stage

Semi finals

Final

Points allocation

Completed match

 Outright win – 12
 Loser if 1st Innings lead obtained – 4
 Loser if tie on 1st Innings – 3
 Loser if 1st Innings also lost – 0
 Tie – 8

Incomplete Match

 1st Innings lead – 6
 1st Innings loss – 3
 Tie on 1st innings – 4

Score Equal in a Drawn Match

 Team batting on the 4th innings – 8
 Team fielding on the 4th innings if that team has lead on 1st inning – 6
 If scores tied on 1st innings – 4
 If team has lost on 1st innings – 3

Abandoned Match

In the event of a match being abandoned without any play having taken place, or in the event of there being no 1st innings decision, three points each.

References

Domestic cricket competitions in 2012–13
2012–13 West Indian cricket season
2012-13